St James' Church, Kingston is a parish church in the Church of England located in Kingston, Isle of Wight. Formerly a separate Anglican parish, Kingston is now amalgamated with the adjacent Anglican parish of Shorwell, as Shorwell with Kingston.

History

The church was re-built by the architect R.J. Jones in 1892.

References

Church of England church buildings on the Isle of Wight
Grade II* listed churches on the Isle of Wight